Josephine Bibit Berry (born February 9, 1994),  better known as Jo Berry, is a Filipino actress. She is currently signed to GMA Artist Center. She has dwarfism.

Early life 
Berry is the youngest of four children born to parents Romilyn "Lynn" and Perry Berry Sr. Her father is Spanish-American, and the president of the Little People's Association of the Philippines (LPAP). Berry was born with dwarfism, same as her father and her eldest brother, while her mother and her two siblings are of average height.

According to her, her ambition is to become an attorney, but she took a course in computer science during her college years. She worked in an outsourcing company prior to becoming an actress.

Career 
Berry started her acting career in the drama anthology series Magpakailanman, where she played the role of Lorna Fernandez. She starred in the television drama series Onanay, where she played the lead role Onay Matayog, a woman born with Achondroplasia.

In 2019, she starred in the drama series The Gift.

Filmography

Television

Film

Accolades

References

External links 

GMA Network profile

Filipino film actresses
Filipino television actresses
GMA Network personalities
Entertainers with dwarfism
Living people
1994 births